Dreams is a United Kingdom-based bed retailer and manufacturer specialising in beds, mattresses, bedroom furniture and bed linen. The first Dreams store was opened in 1987 by Mike Clare, and today there are over 200 stores nationwide. The company has its own purpose-designed mattress factory, and currently employs around 1,500 people, across a network of retail showrooms.

History

The first Dreams store opened in Uxbridge in 1985. By 2000, Dreams had 50 stores, and opened its own mattress factory in Oldbury, Birmingham.

In April 2013, Dreams PLC went into a pre packaged administration, and was purchased by Sun European Partners. It has since traded as Dreams Ltd.

Sun European Partners put the retailer on sale in early 2017, advised by N M Rothschild & Sons.

In May 2021, Dreams were acquired by Tempur Sealy.

TV advertising
Dreams was the main sponsor of the Channel 4 reality television show Celebrity Big Brother from its sixth series in 2009 to its seventh series in 2010.  In 2013, they then sponsored the eleventh series of Celebrity Big Brother, this time on Channel 5.
. Currently (winter 2023) Dreams are sponsoring ITV's Dancing on Ice.

In 2023 Dreams changed it's strapline to "Love your bed".

Investigations
Investigations in to the business's operations have been conducted by the United Kingdom's Office of Fair Trading in 1998 and again in 2001, due to contracts in breach of the Unfair Terms in Consumer Contracts Regulations 1999. Following customer complaints, the company was also investigated and featured on BBC's Watchdog programme. In response to this matter Dreams made an apology on the programme.
	
In February 2007, Dreams was investigated and censured by the Advertising Standards Agency for misleading claims in its promotional material. In 2010, another complaint against Dreams was upheld by the ASA, which ruled that Dreams' advertising broke the rules regarding truthfulness, and contained misleading advertising without evidence to back up its claims.

Awards
 High Street Recycling Champion 2008
 British Safety Council – International Safety Award 2015
West London Business Awards – Retail Business of the Year 2017
Sunday Times Profit Track 100 2018
The Drum Social Buzz Awards 2018 – Best Use of Group/Community (Mumsnet)
National Bed Federation 2018-19 – Large Bed Retailer of the Year

References

External links

Furniture retailers of the United Kingdom
Mattress retailers of the United Kingdom
Retail companies established in 1985
British companies established in 1985
1985 establishments in England
Home decor retailers
Companies based in Buckinghamshire
2013 mergers and acquisitions